Nelson Woolf Polsby (October 25, 1934 – February 6, 2007) was an American political scientist.  He specialized in the study of the United States presidency, the United States Congress and how governmental policies and practices evolve.

Polsby was the Heller Professor of Political Science at the University of California, Berkeley.  He was the editor of the American Political Science Review from 1971–77 and the founding editor of the  Annual Review of Political Science from 1998 until his death in 2007.

Education
Polsby was born in Norwich, Connecticut.  
He attended Pomfret School. a private school in Pomfret, Connecticut.  His family also spent time in Washington, D.C., where Polsby would sit and observe sessions of Congress. Polsby became interested in public opinion and its influence on elections as Joseph R. McCarthy became more powerful in Washington in the 1940s and early 1950s.
 
Polsby earned his undergraduate degree from Johns Hopkins University in 1956 and a master's degree from Brown University in 1957.
He then joined Yale University, where he studied with Robert Dahl. Fellow students included Raymond Wolfinger and Aaron Wildavsky. 
He earned a master's and a doctoral degree from Yale  in 1958 and 1961.  Polsby later sat on Yale's  University Council (1978-2000) and was its president from 1986-1993.

Career
Polsby taught at the University of Wisconsin–Madison (1960–61) and Wesleyan University (1961-1968) before moving to the University of California, Berkeley in 1967; from 1988 to 1999, he was director of Berkeley's Institute of Governmental Studies (IGS).  He was a member of the Council on Foreign Relations and a fellow of the American Academy of Arts and Sciences, the American Association for the Advancement of Science, and the National Academy of Public Administration.

During the 1960s  Polsby did extensive field work and examined the "human nature" of  Congress and the historical implications of recurrent calls for change on the institution.  He was one of several influential political scientists who changed the field.  His paper "The Institutionalization of the U.S. House of Representatives" (1968) was considered "one of the 20 most influential articles published in the American Political Science Review."

Polsby was the author of numerous articles on American politics, both papers for academic journals and political commentary for newspapers and magazines. He sometimes wrote under the pseudonym Arthur Clun.
He wrote or edited more than 20 books, including Political Innovation in America (1984), Congress and the Presidency (1986), and How Congress Evolves (2004).
In 1997, he was commissioned by the non-partisan Twentieth Century Fund to write The New Federalist Papers: Essays in Defense of the Constitution, with Alan Brinkley and Kathleen M. Sullivan.
In addition to his work on American politics, he cowrote ''British Government and its Discontents' (1981) with Geoffrey Peter Smith.

Polsby often used humor to make his political writing more accessible and was frequently quoted by reporters. He is credited with reshaping both academic understanding and public awareness of governmental institutions.

Polsby died February 6, 2007, in Berkeley, California, from heart disease.

Awards
 1985, Wilbur Cross Medal, Yale University
 2003, Frank Goodnow Award for distinguished service, American Political Science Association (APSA)
 Honorary degree, University of Liverpool
 Honorary degree, Oxford University

Publications

References

External links

1934 births
2007 deaths
Johns Hopkins University alumni
Yale University alumni
Wesleyan University faculty
University of California, Berkeley faculty
American political scientists
Fellows of the American Academy of Arts and Sciences
The Century Foundation
Annual Reviews (publisher) editors
Brown University alumni
20th-century political scientists